Gilbert Heron sometimes as Gilbert Haron (6 September 1854 – 18 March 1876) was a Scottish international rugby union player. He played as a forward.

He played for Glasgow Academicals, one of the top teams in Scotland at the time.

He was called up for the Glasgow District side for the 1874 provincial match against Edinburgh District on 5 December 1874.

He was called up to the Scotland squad in February 1874 and played England at The Oval on 23 February 1874.

A year later he was called up to 8 March 1875 match against England in Raeburn Place, Edinburgh.

References

1854 births
1876 deaths
Glasgow Academicals rugby union players
Glasgow District (rugby union) players
History of rugby union in Scotland
Rugby union players from Glasgow
Scotland international rugby union players
Scottish rugby union players
Rugby union forwards